Steven Polge is a game programmer, most noted for his work on Epic Games' Unreal series of games. Polge was hired by Epic in 1997 after creating the Reaper Bot, which is recognized by Guinness World Records as the first computer-controlled deathmatch opponent. In addition to programming on the franchise, he served as lead designer on Unreal Tournament 3, and has been credited on other Epic titles such as Gears of War, Shadow Complex and Fortnite.

Prior to joining Epic, he had worked at IBM after getting his master's degree in computer engineering.

Video game credits 
1998 – Unreal
1999 – Unreal Tournament
2002 – Unreal Tournament 2003
2002 – Unreal Championship
2003 – Unreal II: The Awakening
2004 – Unreal Tournament 2004
2005 – Unreal Championship 2: The Liandri Conflict
2006 – Gears of War
2007 – Unreal Tournament 3
2009 – Shadow Complex
2010 – Infinity Blade
2011 – Infinity Blade II
2011 – Gears of War 3
2011 – Bulletstorm
2013 – Gears of War: Judgment
2017 – Fortnite
On Hold – Unreal Tournament

References

External links

Interviews 

20th-century births
Year of birth missing (living people)
Living people
Video game programmers
Unreal (video game series)
Epic Games